Nickeil Alexander-Walker (born September 2, 1998) is a Canadian professional basketball player for the Minnesota Timberwolves of the National Basketball Association (NBA). He played college basketball for the Virginia Tech Hokies. A shooting guard and a point guard, he was drafted 17th overall by the Brooklyn Nets in the 2019 NBA draft but was traded to the New Orleans Pelicans.

High school career
A native of Toronto, Alexander-Walker played for Vaughan Secondary School, St. Louis Christian Academy, and Hamilton Heights Christian Academy. At Hamilton Heights, he was a teammate of his cousin Shai Gilgeous-Alexander. The two have a close relationship and shared a room at coach Zach Ferrell's house. He was ranked the No. 74 prospect in the class of 2017 according to Scout.com.

College career
Alexander-Walker committed to Virginia Tech in May 2016, over offers from USC and Maryland. As a freshman for the Hokies, Alexander-Walker averaged 10.7 points and 3.8 rebounds per game. In his second game in college, he scored a season-high 29 points in a 132–93 win over The Citadel. He helped lead Virginia Tech to a 21–12 record and NCAA Tournament appearance. In the first round loss to Alabama, Alexander-Walker scored 15 points.

As a sophomore, Alexander-Walker averaged 16.5 points, 4.1 rebounds, and 4.0 assists per game during the regular season. He helped lead Virginia Tech to a 24–8 season, with a 12–6 record in the ACC and a 4 seed in the NCAA Tournament.

Professional career

New Orleans Pelicans (2019–2022)
On June 20, 2019, Alexander-Walker was selected with the 17th overall pick by the Brooklyn Nets in the 2019 NBA draft.

On July 6, 2019, his draft rights were traded to the Atlanta Hawks and then immediately traded again to the New Orleans Pelicans. The next day, the Pelicans announced that they had signed Alexander-Walker. On October 22, 2019, Alexander-Walker made his NBA debut, coming off the bench in a 130–122 overtime loss to the Toronto Raptors. He finished the game with three points, four rebounds, two assists, and two steals. 

On November 16, 2019, Alexander-Walker scored a career-high 27 points, while getting four rebounds and three assists in a 109–94 loss against the Miami Heat. 

On February 26, 2020, the Pelicans assigned Alexander-Walker to the Erie BayHawks of the NBA G League. On February 27, 2020, Alexander-Walker had 23 points, four rebounds, four assists, and two steals in his first G League game, a 125–124 win over the Long Island Nets.

On January 13, 2021, he started for the Pelicans and scored a career-high 37 points against the Los Angeles Clippers.

Utah Jazz (2022–2023)
On February 8, 2022, the Portland Trail Blazers acquired Alexander-Walker, Josh Hart, Tomáš Satoranský, Didi Louzada, a protected 2022 first-round draft pick, the better of New Orleans' and Portland's 2026 second-round draft picks and New Orleans' 2027 second-round draft pick from the New Orleans Pelicans in exchange for CJ McCollum, Larry Nance Jr. and Tony Snell. A day later, Alexander-Walker was traded again, this time to the Utah Jazz in a three-team trade.

Minnesota Timberwolves (2023–present)
On February 9, 2023, Alexander-Walker and Mike Conley Jr. were traded to the Minnesota Timberwolves in a three-team trade with the Los Angeles Lakers.

National team career
Alexander-Walker competed for Canada at the 2016 FIBA Americas Under-18 Championship, leading the team to the silver medal. He led all scorers in the tournament with 17.4 points per game. He also competed for Canada with the senior national team in the Olympic qualifiers in 2021.

On May 24, 2022, Alexander-Walker agreed to a three-year commitment to play with the Canadian senior men's national team.

Career statistics

NBA

Regular season

|-
| style="text-align:left;"|
| style="text-align:left;"|New Orleans
| 47 || 1 || 12.6 || .368 || .346 || .676 || 1.8 || 1.9 || .4 || .2 || 5.7
|-
| style="text-align:left;"|
| style="text-align:left;"|New Orleans
| 46 || 13 || 21.9 || .419 || .347 || .727 || 3.1 || 2.2 || 1.0 || .5 || 11.0
|-
| style="text-align:left;"|
| style="text-align:left;"|New Orleans
| 50 || 19 || 26.3 || .375 || .311 || .722 || 3.3 || 2.8 || .8 || .4 || 12.8
|-
| style="text-align:left;"|
| style="text-align:left;"|Utah
| 15 || 2 || 9.9 || .333 || .303 || .917 || 1.5 || 1.1 || 1.1 || .3 || 3.5
|-
| style="text-align:left;"|
| style="text-align:left;"|Utah
| 36 || 3 || 14.7 || .488 || .402 || .692 || 1.6 || 2.1 || .7 || .4 || 6.3
|- class="sortbottom"
| style="text-align:center;" colspan="2"|Career
| 194 || 38 || 18.5 || .398 || .337 || .721 || 2.4 || 2.2 || .7 || .3 || 8.7

Playoffs

|-
| style="text-align:left;"|2022
| style="text-align:left;"|Utah
| 1 || 0 || 5.0 || 1.000 ||  || 1.000 || 1.0 || 1.0 || 1.0 || .0 || 5.0
|- class="sortbottom"
| style="text-align:center;" colspan="2"|Career
| 1 || 0 || 5.0 || 1.000 ||  || 1.000 || 1.0 || 1.0 || 1.0 || .0 || 5.0

College

|-
| style="text-align:left;"|2017–18
| style="text-align:left;"|Virginia Tech
| 33 || 33 || 25.4 || .449 || .392 || .730 || 3.8 || 1.5 || .8 || .5 || 10.7
|-
| style="text-align:left;"|2018–19
| style="text-align:left;"|Virginia Tech
| 34 || 34 || 34.3 || .474 || .374 || .778 || 4.1 || 4.0 || 1.9 || .5 || 16.2
|- class="sortbottom"
| style="text-align:center;" colspan="2"|Career
| 67 || 67 || 29.9 || .464 || .383 || .763 || 4.0 || 2.7 || 1.4 || .5 || 13.5

Personal life
His cousin, Shai Gilgeous-Alexander, also plays in the NBA, currently for the Oklahoma City Thunder. Nickeil's cousin, Thomasi (Shai's younger brother), was a college basketball player for the Evansville Purple Aces and Northeastern Oklahoma A&M.

Alexander-Walker is the nephew of sprinter Charmaine Gilgeous.

References

External links

 Virginia Tech Hokies bio
 USBasket profile

1998 births
Living people
Basketball players from Toronto
Black Canadian basketball players
Brooklyn Nets draft picks
Canadian expatriate basketball people in the United States
Canadian men's basketball players
National Basketball Association players from Canada
New Orleans Pelicans players
Shooting guards
Utah Jazz players
Virginia Tech Hokies men's basketball players